The name Kajiki has been used to name four tropical cyclones in the northwestern Pacific Ocean. The name was contributed by Japan and refers to fish known as the spearfish or Dorado.
 Tropical Storm Kajiki (2001) (T0124, 30W, Quedan)- a weak tropical storm in late 2001.
 Typhoon Kajiki (2007) (T0719, 19W) – struck Iwo Jima.
 Tropical Storm Kajiki (2014) (T1402, 02W, Basyang) – a storm which headed towards Philippines, killing 6 people.
 Tropical Storm Kajiki (2019) (T1914, 16W, Kabayan)- an erratic storm which affected Vietnam, and caused many floodings in the Philippines. 

Pacific typhoon set index articles